Timothy Scott Couch (born July 31, 1977) is a former American football quarterback who played in the National Football League (NFL) for five seasons with the Cleveland Browns. He played college football at Kentucky, where he set the Southeastern Conference record for single-season passing yards and won Quarterback of the Year as a junior. Selected first overall by the Browns in the 1999 NFL Draft, Couch was the franchise's first draft pick following their reactivation as an expansion team.

Couch threw for over 11,000 passing yards and helped the Browns qualify for the postseason in 2002, but his career would be cut short by injuries. Following attempted comebacks with the Green Bay Packers and Jacksonville Jaguars, he retired after failing to make the final roster for either team. Although Couch was unable to duplicate his college success, he was the first quarterback to lead the Browns to the playoffs since their NFL return and the only to do so between 2002 and 2019.

Early years and high school career
Couch was born in Hyden, Kentucky. As a prep quarterback at Leslie County High School in Hyden, he set a number of national high school records: most pass completions (872), passing yardage (12,104), touchdown passes (132), and passing percentage for a season (75.1). After his senior season in 1995, he was the recipient of Kentucky's "Mr. Football" award. ESPN ranked Couch as the sixth-best high school athlete ever. Couch also starred on the Leslie County High School basketball varsity team. He scored 36 points per game as a junior, which was the highest average in the state. Couch finished his high school career with 3,023 points.

College career
Couch attended the University of Kentucky, where he played for the Kentucky Wildcats football team from 1996 to 1998. During his 1996 freshman year under head coach Bill Curry, he split time as the starting quarterback with Billy Jack Haskins. Curry was fired after a 1–6 start that season, and replacement Hal Mumme announced early that Couch would be the starter in his new pass-oriented air raid offense. In 1997, Couch set several school records as the previously anemic Kentucky offense topped national offensive rankings and finished 5-6 on the season, including a win over #20 Alabama. During the 1998 season, Couch led Kentucky to seven wins (including a win on the road at #21 LSU) and a spot in the Outback Bowl (in which Couch completed 30 of 48 passes for 336 yards and two touchdowns, though Kentucky lost to Penn State 26-14). Following his junior season in 1998, Couch announced he would leave Kentucky to enter the NFL Draft early.

Couch's career totals at Kentucky included completing 795 of 1,184 passes (0.671 completion rate) for 8,435 yards (including 4,275 passing yards during the 1998 season alone) and 74 touchdowns (including a 97-yard touchdown pass to Craig Yeast against Florida on September 26, 1998). Couch still holds the NCAA record for completion percentage in one game (minimum of 40 completions) at 83.0% against Vanderbilt (44 of 53) in 1998 and for completions per game (36.4, 400 in 11 games) that same season. He also left Kentucky holding NCAA records for most completions in a season (400 in 1998), most completions in a two-year period (793 in 1997–1998), most completions per game in a two-year period (34.7, 1997–1998) and career completion percentage (67.1%). His 1998 record of 4,151 offensive yards in a season stood for nine years as a Southeastern Conference (SEC) record until Florida quarterback Tim Tebow broke it with 4,181 yards in 2007. His 1998 total of 4,275 passing yards was an SEC record, until broken by Joe Burrow of LSU.

Statistics

Awards and honors
Second-team All-SEC (1997)
First-team All-SEC (1998)
First-team All-American (1998)
SEC Player of the Year (1998)
Heisman Trophy finalist (1998)

Professional career

Couch's college success culminated in his selection as the number one overall selection in the NFL draft by the Cleveland Browns, who were returning to the NFL as an expansion team in 1999 following the original team's 1996 relocation to Baltimore. Couch took over for Ty Detmer as the team's starting quarterback in the second game of his rookie season. He spent five seasons as a starting quarterback for Cleveland, eventually facing competition from journeyman backup Kelly Holcomb during his final two seasons.

Couch's tenure in Cleveland ranged from leading the team to a playoff appearance, to boos and inconsistent play, which was partially a result of being constantly plagued by injuries. He managed only one 300-yard passing game in his professional career. He missed the final nine games of the 2000 season with a broken thumb. The high point of Couch's career came in 2002, when he threw for 2,842 yards and 18 touchdowns in leading the upstart Browns to a 9–7 record and a playoff appearance. However, he suffered a broken leg in the final game of the regular season and was forced to watch as Holcomb threw for over 400 yards in a loss to the Pittsburgh Steelers in the Wild Card round of the playoffs. This was the beginning of a quarterback controversy in Cleveland that would not be resolved until a year later when head coach Butch Davis tapped Holcomb as his starter. Couch's 2003 season often included playing behind an offensive line hampered by injury. Couch is considered by Fox Sports to be one of the NFL's biggest draft busts in its history after being taken #1, immediately ahead of fellow quarterback Donovan McNabb, only to falter through most of his career. However, Couch's career has been defended by former Browns offensive coordinator Bruce Arians.

Notable moments and achievements

Hail Mary passes
Couch had several notable moments for the Browns, including two "Hail Mary" passes. In 1999 against the New Orleans Saints, his last-second touchdown pass to Kevin Johnson gave the Browns their first win. Three seasons later, in Jacksonville he tossed a game-winning pass on the last play of the game to Quincy Morgan. Couch holds the distinction of being the only quarterback in NFL history to throw two game-winning passes of 50 yards or more with 0:00 left on the clock.

2002 season
Although the 2001 Browns had raised eyebrows with their defense, having recorded 43 sacks and a league-best 33 interceptions, the offense was once again moribund. The run game was pitiful and the offensive line was porous. At the start of the 2002 preseason, star linebacker Jamir Miller went down with a career-ending Achilles tendon injury. However, the team, led by Couch, won 9 games, including five in the final two minutes and seven by 10 points or less, and made a wildcard playoff spot. Those thrillers included a 31–28 overtime win over Tennessee in which Couch threw for 326 yards and 3 touchdowns, a last minute touchdown and two-point conversion passes from Couch to Dennis Northcutt against the Jets, the "Hail Mary" against the Jaguars, and a final-minute drive against Baltimore where Couch threw a 1-yard touchdown pass to tight end Mark Campbell after being pinned inside his own 5-yard line with 0 timeouts and 1:30 left in regulation.

All-time ranks

Couch ranks second (after Baker Mayfield) for the Browns in all-time career completion percentage at 59.8% (600 attempts or more). He also ranks 7th all-time in touchdown passes (64), 6th in QB rating (75.1), 4th in passing attempts (1,741), 3rd in completions (1,025), 5th in passing yards (11,131). Couch still holds the franchise single-game record for pass completions (36 against Tennessee in 2002) His rookie records for pass attempts (399), pass completions (223), passing yards (2,447), and QB rating (73.2) were broken by Colt McCoy in 2010 and Brandon Weeden in 2012. He was the Browns' leading passer from 1999 to 2002.

Attempted comebacks
After the Browns released Couch in 2004, Couch signed as a free agent with the Green Bay Packers. Couch went on to have a disappointing training camp, and was booed off the field by the Lambeau Field crowd during his limited preseason appearances. Couch struggled with a rotator cuff injury, that would eventually require surgery, and was sidelined for the entire year.

Couch was released by the Packers during their final cutdown to 53 players prior to the season.  Couch filed a grievance with the NFL Players Union against the Packers because they failed to attempt an injury settlement prior to his release.

After undergoing shoulder surgery in February 2005, Couch auditioned for the Chicago Bears midway through the 2005 season and the Cincinnati Bengals in December 2005. The Bears observed that his arm was not back to NFL shape during their workout and did not sign him. The Bengals did not pursue Couch, although Jon Kitna was not re-signed after his contract expired in early 2006.

Couch participated in tryouts with the Tennessee Titans in January 2006. He also had workouts with the Miami Dolphins, Pittsburgh Steelers, and the Houston Texans. All three teams stated that despite good workouts, they were not interested in pursuing him. Couch ended up missing the entire 2006 season due to another shoulder surgery, late June 2006.

ESPN reported on July 20, 2007, that Couch had contacted all 32 NFL teams to see if any teams were interested in him for the 2007–2008 season. On July 29, 2007, Couch agreed to a two-year contract with the Jacksonville Jaguars.

Couch was brought in to compete for the third-string quarterback position with Quinn Gray and Lester Ricard. He played in one preseason game against the Miami Dolphins and was 2-of-4 for 11 yards. On August 18, Couch failed to make the third string and was released. The next week, the Jaguars released former starter Byron Leftwich and Lester Ricard, leaving them without a third-string quarterback.

NFL career statistics

Awards and honors
NFL Rookie of the Month (October 1999)
AFC Offensive Player of the Week (9/22/02)

Broadcasting career
In 2002, Couch played himself in an episode of The Jersey called "Cheers, Jeers and Tears" where after crying over her responsibilities as being cheerleading captain, Hillary Lighter (played by Brianne Prather) uses a magical jersey as she jumps into his body in order to get advice/lessons from professional cheerleaders on new cheers to the shock of the coach along with the other players.

Couch currently works for Fox Sports South as an analyst on the weekly show SEC Gridiron Live. He also serves as the color analyst for the SEC Regional Network football package, typically found on Fox Sports Net affiliates in most SEC territories. Current affiliates include Sun Sports, Fox Sports South, Fox Sports Southwest Plus, Fox Sports Houston, Fox Sports Midwest Plus, Fox Sports North Plus, and Fox Sports San Diego.

On April 11, 2018, the Browns announced that Couch would be calling their 2018 preseason games alongside Jay Crawford.

References

External links
 

1977 births
Living people
All-American college football players
American football quarterbacks
American people of Cornish descent
Cleveland Browns players
College football announcers
Green Bay Packers players
Jacksonville Jaguars players
Kentucky Wildcats football players
National Football League first-overall draft picks
People from Hyden, Kentucky
Players of American football from Lexington, Kentucky
Sportspeople from Lexington, Kentucky